Shir-e Sangi (Stone Lion cemetery) is an attraction in Hamadan, Iran.

References

External links
Blog entry with photos of Shir e Sangi

Hamadan